Stephen Cullen (born 9 November 1970) is an Irish swimmer. He competed in three events at the 1988 Summer Olympics.

References

External links
 

1970 births
Living people
Irish male swimmers
Olympic swimmers of Ireland
Swimmers at the 1988 Summer Olympics
Place of birth missing (living people)